Buttercrambe is a small village in the Buttercrambe with Bossall civil parish, in the Ryedale district of North Yorkshire, England.

It, with Bossall parish had a recorded population of about 100 in the 2001 Census.

Aldby Hall and the Church of St John the Evangelist are at the centre of the village. To the west of Buttercrambe, on high ground, are the remains of a Roman Temporary Camp: a square enclosure, ditched and banked, constructed quickly by an army on manoeuvres in enemy territory and used either overnight or for a short period of time, and demolished upon abandonment of the site. The camp was constructed probably 20 years before the establishment of nearby Eboracum, Roman York, in 71 AD.

Gallery

References

External links

Villages in North Yorkshire